Sharon Dawn Moore Myers is an American retired Paralympic athlete, swimmer and wheelchair basketball player who competed at international elite competitions. She is a four time Paralympic champion.

References

Living people
Sportspeople from Virginia
Paralympic track and field athletes of the United States
Paralympic swimmers of the United States
American female wheelchair racers
American women's wheelchair basketball players
American female discus throwers
American female javelin throwers
American female shot putters
Athletes (track and field) at the 1972 Summer Paralympics
Athletes (track and field) at the 1976 Summer Paralympics
Athletes (track and field) at the 1980 Summer Paralympics
Swimmers at the 1968 Summer Paralympics
Swimmers at the 1972 Summer Paralympics
Swimmers at the 1976 Summer Paralympics
Swimmers at the 1980 Summer Paralympics
Medalists at the 1972 Summer Paralympics
Medalists at the 1976 Summer Paralympics
Medalists at the 1980 Summer Paralympics
Date of birth missing (living people)
Year of birth missing (living people)
20th-century American women
American female swimmers
Wheelchair discus throwers
Wheelchair javelin throwers
Wheelchair shot putters
Paralympic discus throwers
Paralympic javelin throwers
Paralympic shot putters